José Gálvez may refer to:
 José de Gálvez, 1st Marquess of Sonora, an 18th-century official of New Spain
 José Gálvez FBC, football club 
 José Gálvez District, district in Peru
 José Gálvez Barrenechea, Peruvian politician
 José Galvez (photojournalist)